Gmina Pniewy may refer to either of the following gminas (municipalities) in Poland:
Gmina Pniewy, Masovian Voivodeship (east-central Poland)
Gmina Pniewy, Greater Poland Voivodeship (west Poland)